Vaatpokki Ratnagiriswarar  temple is a Hindu temple located at  Karur district of Tamil Nadu, India. The presiding deity is Shiva. He is called as Ratnagiriswarar. His consort is Surumbar Kuzhali.

Significance 
It is one of the shrines of the 275 Paadal Petra Sthalams. Thirunavukkarasar have sung hymns in praise of the temple by Sundarar and Appar.

References 

 
 

Hindu temples in Karur district
Padal Petra Stalam